Vehi Sheamda (Hebrew: וְהִיא שֶׁעָמְדָה) is a short passage in the Haggadah of Passover Seder that deals with saving the people of Israel by God, from all His enemies. It is customary to read the passage in a melody, and today it is also prevalent as a piyut on its own. It follows the previous paragraph of the text regarding God's promise of ending the exile of the Jews and moreover, setting them free with much wealth.

References

Passover songs
Hebrew-language songs